Killer's Delight is a 1978 American slasher film directed, edited, and produced by Jeremy Hoenack, written by Maralyn Thoma, and starring James Luisi, Susan Sullivan, John Karlen, Martin Speer, Hilarie Thompson, and Anne-Marie Martin. Its plot follows a brutal serial killer committing murders in the San Francisco Bay area. The film was loosely based on the crimes of Ted Bundy.

In several European countries, the film was released under the title The Sport Killer, and was also released as The Dark Ride.

Cast

Release
The film screened regionally in Longview, Texas alongside Haunts (1976) on April 12, 1978, before opening in San Diego, California on April 28, 1978.

In several  European markets, the film was released under the title The Sport Killer, though it was released theatrically in the United States as Killer's Delight; it was later re-released under the alternate title The Dark Ride.

References

Sources

External links

1978 films
1978 horror films
1970s exploitation films
American exploitation films
American films based on actual events
American independent films
American serial killer films
1970s slasher films
American slasher films
Films set in San Francisco
Films shot in San Francisco
1970s American films